Guilherme 'Gui' Khury (born 18 December 2008, in Curitiba, Brazil) is a Brazilian skateboarder. He is the first person to land a 1080 (three full revolutions) on a vertical ramp and the youngest person to win a gold medal at the X-Games.

Khury also holds the record for being the youngest person ever to land a 900, which he landed at age 8, as well as for being the youngest person to compete at the X Games at the age of 10 years and 7 months.

In 2020, he was officially awarded two Guinness World Records for being the Youngest X Games Athlete and for the first 1080 on a vertical ramp, followed by a third in 2021 for being the youngest male X-Games gold medalist.

Early life
Khury was born in Curitiba, Brazil in 2008, along with his twin sister. In 2011, his family moved to Carlsbad, California, when he was two years old. He started training at young age, being encouraged by his father.  He started training at the YMCA in Encinitas, California, at the age of four. In 2015, the family moved back to Brazil, where his father built an indoor ramp for him to practice. He completed his first 540 at the age of 7, becoming the youngest to do so. Three months later, he had landed his first 720 and became the youngest in the world to land it.
In July 2017, he suffered a serious accident, fracturing his skull when he fell from a second-story window, landing on a gas meter. At the age of 9, he became the youngest skater to descend a mega ramp, when he went down Bob Burnquist's 60-foot mega ramp In 2021, he landed "The McKenzie" (a 720° (making two complete turns) on the axis and landing with the back foot).

Skateboarding highlights

900

In 2017, at the age of 8, Khury became the youngest person in the world to land a 900, a 2½-revolution (900 degrees) aerial spin performed on a skateboard ramp. Tony Hawk popularized this move when he was the first to achieve this feat, in 1999.

X Games
Khury was invited to his first X Games at the 2019 X Games Summer Event in Minneapolis. By participating in the event, he became the youngest ever competitor at an X Games at the age of 10 years and 7 months, breaking the previous record set by Jagger Eaton seven years earlier.  At the same time, he became the youngest athlete to land a 900 at an X Games.

1080

On 8 May 2020, at age 11, Khury became the first person to land a 1080 (three full revolutions) on a vertical ramp, breaking Tony Hawk’s record 900 on a vertical ramp set in 1999.  (Tom Schaar landed the first-ever 1080 at the age of 12 in 2012 on a mega ramp, which allows a skater to build up more momentum than on a standard vert ramp.) He achieved it after 10 attempts. Khury performed the feat “in an indoor skateboard training facility built at his home in Curitiba, Brazil, by Green Box,” a Brazilian company.  Khury's father, Ricardo Khury Filho, credited school closures due to the COVID-19 pandemic with providing his son extra time and energy to practice the technique. Professional skateboarders Bob Burnquist and Tony Hawk called him to congratulate him on the accomplishment.

X-Games Gold
On 16 July 2021, at the 2021 Summer X-Games, Khury became the youngest athlete to win a gold medal at the X-Games, at age 12, in the Skateboard Best Vert Trick competition, where he landed the first successful 1080 in a competition (after having initially completed the trick 14 months prior in solo training). Khury successfully landed a 1080 on the vertical ramp on his 7th and final attempt of the competition. Tony Hawk also was a competitor in the event, coming out of retirement to compete at the X-Games for the first time since 2003.

Further highlights
In April 2022, at the 2022 Spring X Games in Chiba, Japan, Khury landed another 1080 in the Vert Best Trick contest winning the silver medal, being defeated by Mitchie Brusco, and also won bronze in the Vert Skate competition, becoming the youngest person to ever win a medal in the event at the X Games. At the 2022 Summer X Games in Los Angeles, he won two silver medals in Vertical Skate and Vert Best Trick. In July 2022, he won gold at Vert Battle. In September 2022, he won silver in the Men's Park competition at the STU National 2022.

Guinness World Records

References

Brazilian skateboarders
Living people
2008 births
X Games athletes
Sportspeople from Curitiba
Brazilian emigrants to the United States
Sportspeople from Carlsbad, California